Austrodrillia beraudiana is a species of sea snail, a marine gastropod mollusk in the family Horaiclavidae.

It was previously categorized within the family Turridae.

Description
The length of the shell attains 17 mm. This is a stouter, shorter shell than Austrodrillia angasi, with fewer, more widely spaced ribs.

Distribution
This marine species is endemic to Australia and occurs off New South Wales (Clarence River), southernTasmania and Victoria.

References

 Crosse, H. 1863. Description d'espèces nouvelles d'Australie. Journal de Conchyliologie 11: 84–90
 Angas, G.F. 1867. A list of species of marine Mollusca found in Port Jackson harbour, New South Wales, and on the adjacent coasts, with notes on their habits, etc. Part I. Proceedings of the Zoological Society of London 1867: 185–233
 Tenison-Woods, J.E. 1879. On some new Tasmanian marine shells. Proceedings of the Royal Society of Tasmania 1878: 32–40 
 Hedley, C. 1922. A revision of the Australian Turridae. Records of the Australian Museum 13(6): 213–359, pls 42–56 
 May, W.L. 1923. An Illustrated Index of Tasmanian Shells: with 47 plates and 1052 species. Hobart : Government Printer 100 pp.
 Laseron, C. 1954. Revision of the New South Wales Turridae (Mollusca). Australian Zoological Handbook. Sydney : Royal Zoological Society of New South Wales 1–56, pls 1–12.
 Wells, F.E. 1990. Revision of the recent Australian Turridae referred to the genera Splendrillia and Austrodrillia. Journal of the Malacological Society of Australasia 11: 73–117 
 Wilson, B. 1994. Australian Marine Shells. Prosobranch Gastropods. Kallaroo, WA : Odyssey Publishing Vol. 2 370 pp.

External links
 
  Tucker, J.K. 2004 Catalog of recent and fossil turrids (Mollusca: Gastropoda). Zootaxa 682:1–1295
 Syntype at MNHN, Paris

beraudiana
Gastropods of Australia